Sjur Røthe (born 2 July 1988) is a Norwegian cross-country skier. He is a three-time World champion.

Career
He made his World Cup debut in March 2009 in Trondheim, but did not finish the race, and collected his first World Cup points in November 2009 in Beitostølen, with an eighteenth place. A fifteenth place in a 4 × 10 km relay race followed.

He represents the sports club Voss IL, and lives in Oslo. He was diagnosed with Bekhterev's disease.

Cross-country skiing results
All results are sourced from the International Ski Federation (FIS).

Olympic Games

Distance reduced to 30 km due to weather conditions.

World Championships
6 medals – (3 gold, 3 bronze)

World Cup

Season standings

Individual podiums
6 victories – (2 ,  4 ) 
30 podiums – (18 , 12 )

Team podiums
 7 victories – (7 ) 
 14 podiums – (14 )

References

External links

 
 

1988 births
Living people
People from Voss
Norwegian male cross-country skiers
Tour de Ski skiers
FIS Nordic World Ski Championships medalists in cross-country skiing
Cross-country skiers at the 2014 Winter Olympics
Cross-country skiers at the 2022 Winter Olympics
Olympic cross-country skiers of Norway
Sportspeople from Vestland
21st-century Norwegian people